Viktor Ivanovich Cherepkov (16 April 1942 – 2 September 2017) was a Russian naval officer and politician who was a Deputy of the State Duma of the third and fourth convocation. He was mayor of Vladivostok (1993–1994; 1996–1998).

Biography

Naval career
He graduated from the railway technical school and the Pacific higher military-sea school.

From 1967 to 1993, Cherepkov served in the Pacific Fleet of the Soviet and Russian Navy. Cherepkov left the Navy as a Captain 1st rank.

Political career
In 1990, Cherepkov was elected as a deputy to the council for Primorsky Krai.

In 1993, Cherepkov became the Mayor of Vladivostok.

One year into his term, Cherepkov was accused of accepting bribes and was suspended from his duties as mayor. He blockaded himself his office at the city hall, which resulted in the OMON having to storm the building.

Although the local prosecutor dropped the charges against Cherepkov in November 1994, Russian President Boris Yeltsin signed an executive order removing him from his post.

He regained the mayorship in 1996 after the State Duma passed a resolution declaring his removal from office illegal. President Yeltsin later issued an order to restore Cherepkov in September 1996. Cherepkov's return to office lasted only two years with Yeltsin reversing course and suspending the mayor again in November 1998.

Cherepkov was elected to the city council of Vladivostok in January 1999, but had his election overturned by a local court only three months later.

In 2000, Cherepkov won a seat in the State Duma. He was re-elected in 2004.

In December 2011, Cherepkov announced the intention to run for President of Russia in the 2012 elections. Although he was nominated as a candidate for the election, he refused to turn in the required two million signatures in order to become registered by election officials.

In 2013, Cherepkov attempted to regain his former post as mayor with the Green Alliance Party. He finished second in that race.

Death
Cherepkov died of cancer on the morning of 2 September 2017 in the Central Clinical Hospital of Moscow. According to his will, he was buried in Vladivostok.

References

External links
 Биография на сайте партии «Свобода и Народовластие»
 Виктор Черепков не согласился с президентом

1942 births
2017 deaths
Russian Navy personnel
People from Skopinsky District
Mayors of places in Russia
Politicians from Vladivostok
20th-century Russian politicians
21st-century Russian politicians
Deaths from cancer in Russia
Third convocation members of the State Duma (Russian Federation)
Fourth convocation members of the State Duma (Russian Federation)
Military personnel from Vladivostok